Lacinipolia explicata. the explicit arches moth, is a moth of the family Noctuidae. It is found in the south-eastern part of the United States, from Kentucky and North Carolina south to Florida and west to Missouri and Texas.

The wingspan is 28–30 mm. Adults are on wing in April and again in September in two generations per year.

The larvae feed on Trifolium species and Taraxacum officinale.

External links
Bug Guide
Images

Hadeninae
Moths described in 1937
Taxa named by James Halliday McDunnough